The Court of Chancery was a court of equity in England and Wales.

Court of Chancery or Chancery Court may also refer to:
Chancery Court of York, an ecclesiastical court in England
Chancery Division of the High Court of Justice, present-day court in England and Wales
 Delaware Court of Chancery
 Mississippi Chancery Courts, part of the Courts of Mississippi
 Tennessee Chancery and Probate Courts, part of the Courts of Tennessee
 New Jersey Chancery Courts, part of the New Jersey Superior Court

Court of Chancery may also refer to the following former civil courts:
 Court of Chancery (Ireland)
 Court of Chancery of the County Palatine of Durham and Sadberge
 Court of Chancery of the County Palatine of Lancaster
 Court of Chancery of Upper Canada
 New York Court of Chancery
 Michigan Court of Chancery

See also
 Court of Appeal in Chancery, which heard appeals from the English Court of Chancery
Chancery (disambiguation)
Court of equity